Rajesh Thakur is an Indian politician who is the member of 13th Himachal Pradesh Assembly from 2017. He is winner in 2017 Himachal Pradesh Legislative Assembly election in which he got 33,977 votes. He is serving as current MLA in Gagret Assembly constituency.

Personal life 
He was born on 2 June 1965 in Panaji, Goa.

References 

Himachal Pradesh politicians
1965 births
Living people